In enzymology, a cis-2,3-dihydrobiphenyl-2,3-diol dehydrogenase is an enzyme that catalyzes the chemical reaction

cis-3-phenylcyclohexa-3,5-diene-1,2-diol + NAD+  biphenyl-2,3-diol + NADH + H+

Thus, the two substrates of this enzyme are cis-3-phenylcyclohexa-3,5-diene-1,2-diol and NAD+, whereas its 3 products are biphenyl-2,3-diol, NADH, and H+.

This enzyme belongs to the family of oxidoreductases, specifically those acting on the CH-CH group of donor with NAD+ or NADP+ as acceptor.  The systematic name of this enzyme class is cis-3-phenylcyclohexa-3,5-diene-1,2-diol:NAD+ oxidoreductase. This enzyme is also called 2,3-dihydro-2,3-dihydroxybiphenyl dehydrogenase.  This enzyme participates in biphenyl degradation.

References

 
 
 

EC 1.3.1
NADH-dependent enzymes
Enzymes of unknown structure